Hidayat is a given name and a surname. Notable people with the name include:

Ignatius Hidayat Allah (d. 1639/1640), Syriac Orthodox Patriarch of Antioch
Hidayat Amin Arsala (born 1942), economist and a prominent politician in Afghanistan
Shahzada Muhammad Hidayat Afshar, Ilahi Bakhsh Bahadur (1809–1878), the 23rd head of the Mughal Dynasty, born in Delhi
Arief Hidayat (born 1956), the fifth and current chief justice of the Constitutional Court of Indonesia
Cucu Hidayat, Indonesian footballer
Komaruddin Hidayat (born 1953), Muslim academic and intellectual from Indonesia
Mahdi Quli Khan Hidayat (1863–1955), prime minister of Iran and an author of several books
Mohamad Suleman Hidayat (born 1944), Indonesian businessman and politician from Jombang, East Java
Muhyi ad-Din Muzaffar Jang Hidayat (died 1751), the ruler of Hyderabad from 1750 to his death in battle in 1751
Rachmad Hidayat (born 1991), Indonesian professional footballer
Shazia Hidayat (born 1976), Pakistani former track and field athlete
Taufik Hidayat (born 1981), retired Indonesian badminton player
Hidayat Inayat Khan (1917–2016), English-French classical composer, conductor, representative of the International Sufi Movement
Hidayat Orujov (born 1944), writer and an Azerbaijani politician, Chairman of State Committee for Work with Religious Organizations of Azerbaijan Republic
Ghulam Hussain Hidayat Ullah, Pakistani politician from Sindh
Hidayat Ullah, Pakistani politician and a member of Senate of Pakistan, affiliated with Awami National Party
Muhammad Hidayat Ullah (1905–1992), the eleventh chief justice of India and the sixth vice-president of India
Hidayat Nur Wahid (born 1960), the Speaker of Indonesia People's Consultative Assembly 2004–2009
Hidayat (poet) (15th century), Azerbaijani poet and Aq Qoyunlu statesman

See also
12176 Hidayat, minor planet
Hidayat al-Muta`allemin Fi al-Tibb, Arabic language medical guide written in Dari
Hidayat TV, Islamic satellite TV Channel based in the United Kingdom
Hidayatou

Indonesian-language surnames
Surnames of Indonesian origin